Magdhaba-Rafah and Maghdaba-Rafah were battle honours awarded to units of the Australian Imperial Force and the New Zealand Expeditionary Force that took part in the Affair of Magdhaba or the Action of Rafah during the winter of 1916–17 in the Sinai Campaign of the Great War.

Australian units were awarded Magdhaba-Rafah:
1st Light Horse Regiment
2nd Light Horse Regiment
3rd Light Horse Regiment
8th Light Horse Regiment
9th Light Horse Regiment
10th Light Horse Regiment
14th Light Horse Regiment
15th Light Horse Regiment
26th (Tasmanian Mounted Infantry) Light Horse Regiment

New Zealand units were awarded Maghdaba-Rafah:
1st Mounted Rifles (Canterbury Yeomanry Cavalry)
Queen Alexandra's 2nd (Wellington West Coast) Mounted Rifles
3rd (Auckland) Mounted Rifles
4th (Waikato) Mounted Rifles
6th (Manawatu) Mounted Rifles
9th (Wellington East Coast) Mounted Rifles
10th (Nelson) Mounted Rifles
11th (North Auckland) Mounted Rifles

Notes and references

Battle honours of the British Army